Raymond Keith Loper (March 23, 1926 – October 23, 2012) was an American football, baseball and college wrestling coach. He served as the head football coach at Whitman College in Walla Walla, Washington from 1962 to 1966. Loper was also the head baseball and wrestling coach at Whitman before serving as the head baseball coach at the University of Nevada, Reno from 1972 to 1973.

Head coaching record

College football

References

1926 births
2012 deaths
Colorado State Rams baseball players
Colorado State Rams football players
Nevada Wolf Pack baseball coaches
Whitman Blues baseball coaches
Whitman Fighting Missionaries football coaches
College wrestling coaches in the United States
High school football coaches in Colorado
High school football coaches in Wyoming
Junior college football coaches in the United States
People from Montrose County, Colorado
Players of American football from Colorado